Vladimir Nikolayevich Filippov (born 5 May 1968) is a Russian professional football coach and a former player. He is an assistant coach with the Under-19 squad of PFC Krylia Sovetov Samara.

Club career
He made his professional debut in the Soviet First League in 1985 for FC Krylia Sovetov Kuybyshev. He played 4 games and scored 2 goals in the UEFA Cup 1994–95 for FC Tekstilshchik Kamyshin. He played two games in 1987 for PFC CSKA Moscow in the Soviet Cup.

References

1968 births
Sportspeople from Samara, Russia
Living people
Soviet footballers
Association football midfielders
Association football defenders
Russian footballers
Russian football managers
PFC Krylia Sovetov Samara players
FC Tekstilshchik Kamyshin players
Russian Premier League players
FC Lada-Tolyatti players
PFC CSKA Moscow players
FC Rubin Kazan players
FC Elista players
FC Nosta Novotroitsk players